Sean Philip O'Hanlon (born 2 January 1983) is an English retired footballer. O'Hanlon played for Swindon Town, Milton Keynes Dons, Hibernian, Carlisle United and Stockport County.

Career
O'Hanlon started his career in his native Merseyside with Everton, but he did not make an appearance for their first team. He joined Swindon Town, initially on loan, and he became a regular in their first team squad and was made team captain after the departure of Andy Gurney in 2005.

He signed for Milton Keynes Dons in 2006 and featured regularly in their team. One of the most notable moments of O'Hanlon's career was when he scored a goal with a towering header at Wembley Stadium in the 2008 Football League Trophy Final victory against Grimsby Town. He missed most of the 2009–10 season due to a knee injury. At the end of the 2010–11 season, O'Hanlon was told his contract would not be renewed, despite having made 37 appearances that season.

O'Hanlon signed for Scottish Premier League club Hibernian on a two-year contract in June 2011. He lost his place in the Hibs first team after Pat Fenlon was appointed manager. O'Hanlon left Hibs by mutual consent on 31 August 2012. He played as a trialist for junior club Bonnyrigg in November 2012.

O'Hanlon signed for Football League One club Carlisle United on 11 January 2013, agreeing a contract with the club until the end of the 2012–13 season. on 12 April 2013 he signed a two-year extension to his contract. On 4 May 2015, O'Hanlon was released by Carlisle.

O'Hanlon signed for Stockport County on 29 May 2015 on a season long contract. He was immediately given the role of captain.. He left Stockport at end of the 2015–16 season.

Career statistics

Honours
Milton Keynes Dons
Football League Trophy: 2007–08
Football League Two: 2007–08

Individual
PFA Team of the Year: 2008–09 League One

References

External links

1983 births
Living people
Footballers from Liverpool
English footballers
Association football central defenders
Everton F.C. players
Swindon Town F.C. players
Milton Keynes Dons F.C. players
Hibernian F.C. players
Carlisle United F.C. players
English Football League players
Scottish Premier League players
Bonnyrigg Rose Athletic F.C. players
Stockport County F.C. players

Appointed Marine AFC u23 Manager on the 20 of June 2022